The Manchester Township School District is a comprehensive community school district serving students in pre-kindergarten through twelfth grade in Manchester Township, in Ocean County, New Jersey, United States.

The Manchester Township School District is also the receiving district for approximately 150 high school students from neighboring Lakehurst Borough, who attend as part of a sending/receiving relationship with the Lakehurst School District.

As of the 2020–21 school year, the district, comprised of six schools, had an enrollment of 2,922 students and 277.7 classroom teachers (on an FTE basis), for a student–teacher ratio of 10.5:1.

The district is classified by the New Jersey Department of Education as being in District Factor Group "B", the second lowest of eight groupings. District Factor Groups organize districts statewide to allow comparison by common socioeconomic characteristics of the local districts. From lowest socioeconomic status to highest, the categories are A, B, CD, DE, FG, GH, I and J.

Attendance boundary
The district includes high school students from the Lakehurst component of Joint Base McGuire–Dix–Lakehurst.

Schools 

Schools in the district (with 2020–21 enrollment data from the National Center for Education Statistics) are:

Elementary schools
Manchester Township Elementary School with 565 students in grades K-5
Linda Waldron, Principal
Ridgeway Elementary School with 415 students in grades PreK-5
Deniese Guinan, Principal
Whiting Elementary School with 248 students in grades PreK-5
Evelyn Swift, Principal
Middle school
Manchester Township Middle School with 643 students in grades 6-8
Nancy Driber, Principal
High school)
Manchester Township High School with 1,000 students in grades 9-12
Dennis Adams, Principal
Other
Regional Day School with 54 students in grades PreK-12, serves low incidence handicapped children
Lisa Michallis, Principal

Administration
Core members of the district's administration are:
John Berenato, Superintendent
Craig Lorentzen, Business Administrator / Board Secretary

Board of education
The district's board of education, comprised of seven members, sets policy and oversees the fiscal and educational operation of the district through its administration. As a Type II school district, the board's trustees are elected directly by voters to serve three-year terms of office on a staggered basis, with either two or three seats up for election each year held (since 2013) as part of the November general election. The board appoints a superintendent to oversee the day-to-day operation of the district. An eighth member represents the Lakehurst sending district.

References

External links
Manchester Township School District
 
School Data for the Manchester Township School District, National Center for Education Statistics

Manchester Township, New Jersey
New Jersey District Factor Group B
School districts in Ocean County, New Jersey